Jean-Luc Fugaldi (23 August 1946 – 2005) was a French footballer.

Fugaldi played professionally for CS Sedan Ardennes and Valenciennes FC.

External links
Profile at Afterfoot.fr

1946 births
2005 deaths
French footballers
Footballers from Lille
CS Sedan Ardennes players
Valenciennes FC players
Association footballers not categorized by position